Wilhelmson is a surname. Notable people with the surname include:

Carl Wilhelmson (1866–1928), Swedish painter, graphic artist, amateur photographer, and art teacher
Karin Wilhelmson (1933–2018), Swedish journalist and radio producer

See also
Wilhelmsen